Faisal Al-Essa (Arabic: فيصل العيسى; born January 1, 1982), Saudi Arabian actor.

Works

Series TV 
Tash ma Tash
Shabab Albomb (2012-) (SaudiTV, Rotana Khalijiah)
Diary Rashid (2003)
Galbt JD (2019) (stc tv)
MUMG (2020) (Shahid, MBC1, MBC Iraq)
Wish Tabi Bas (2021) (Shahid, MBC1, MBC Iraq)

Plays 
shalalna al dawori (2015)

Programs
Sawalef (2009)
The Cube (2010)

References

1982 births
Living people
Saudi Arabian male television actors